Fruitville, also known locally as Fruthville, is an unincorporated community in Mayhew Lake Township, Benton County, Minnesota, United States.  The community is located along Benton County Road 13 at 40th Avenue NE near Sauk Rapids and Foley. 

In 1901, the community was named for brothers Simon and Peter Fruth, early settlers.  The GNIS has it named as Fruitville.

References

Unincorporated communities in Benton County, Minnesota
Unincorporated communities in Minnesota